Hello Love is the fifth studio album by Chris Tomlin, released on September 2, 2008. It debuted at No. 9 on the Billboard 200 with 52,000 units, his best sales and charting week to date. The album also debuted at No. 2 on the Christian album charts. It was Grammy-nominated for Best Pop/Contemporary Gospel Album at the 51st Grammy Awards in 2009. It was certified Gold by the RIAA in September 2010.

Track listing

Personnel 
 Chris Tomlin – lead vocals, acoustic guitar (2, 5, 8-12), electric guitar (3), backing vocals (4, 8)
 Ed Cash – backing vocals (1, 2, 3, 5, 6, 9, 10), electric guitar (1-9, 11), acoustic guitar (2, 4–9, 11), string arrangements (2, 5, 8, 12), pads (6), programming (6), mandolin (6), choir arrangements (6), choir director (6), bass (7), drums (7)
 Matt Gilder – keyboards (1-8, 10, 11, 12), acoustic piano (1-4, 6, 7, 9, 11), Hammond B3 organ (1, 3, 4, 11), string arrangements (2), Wurlitzer electric piano (9)
 Daniel Carson – electric guitar
 Martin Cash – electric guitar (8)
 Jesse Reeves – bass (1-6, 8-11)
 Travis Nunn – drums (1-6, 8-11)
 John Catchings – cello (2, 5, 12)
 David Davidson – strings (2, 5, 8, 12)
 Watoto Children's Choir – choir (6)
 Mercy Naiukenge – choir director (6)
 Christy Nockels – backing vocals (7)

Singers (Tracks 2, 5, 9 & 11)
 Daniel Carson, Ed Cash, Nirva Dorsaint-Ready, Matt Gilder, Gale Mayes, Christy Nockels, Nathan Nockels, Travis Nunn, Leanne Palmore, Veronica Petrucci,  Seth Ready, Jesse Reeves, Christi Richardson, Chris Tomlin, Jerard Woods and Jovaun Woods

Gang vocals on "You Lifted Me Out"
 Daniel Carson, Ed Cash, Matt Gilder, Travis Nunn and Jesse Reeves

Production 
 Louie Giglio – executive producer
 Brad O'Donnell – executive producer
 Ed Cash – producer, overdub recording, mixing (5, 8, 9, 11, 12), engineer (7)
 Shane D. Wilson – recording (1-6, 8-12)
 Chris Lord-Alge – mixing (1, 2)
 F. Reid Shippen – mixing (3, 4, 6, 7, 10)
 Ocean Way (Nashville, Tennessee) – recording studio (1-6, 8-12)
 P.J. Fenech – assistant engineer (1-6, 8-12)
 Jacob Murry – assistant engineer (1-6, 8-12)
 Ed's (Franklin, Tennessee) – recording location (7, overdubs)
 Matt Armstrong – overdub recording assistant, assistant engineer (7)
 Ted Jensen – mastering
 Sterling Sound (New York City, New York) – mastering location
 Jeremy Cowart – photography
 Gary Dorsey – art direction, design
 Shelley Giglio – art direction
 Pixel Peach – design
 Jan Cook – art production
 Tim Frank – art production
 Jess Chambers – A&R administration

Charts

Weekly charts

Year-end charts

Singles 

 "Jesus Messiah" (2008)
 "I Will Rise" (2009)
 "Sing Sing Sing" (2009)

Worship Leader Edition 

Hello Love was also released as a worship leader edition, which included a bonus disc with chord charts, lyrics and seven New Song Cafe videos, along with a video greeting from Chris.

Awards 

The album was nominated for a Dove Award for Praise and Worship Album of the Year at the 40th GMA Dove Awards.

References 

2008 albums
Chris Tomlin albums